Princess Yolanda of Savoy (1 June 1901 – 16 October 1986) was the eldest daughter of King Victor Emmanuel III of Italy.

Biography
She was born Principessa Iolanda Margherita Milena Elisabetta Romana Maria di Savoia in Rome, Italy, as the eldest child and daughter of King Victor Emmanuel III of Italy and Elena of Montenegro. As a young woman she was a great sportswoman, particularly interested in swimming and riding.

During the Great War, newspapers published reports of her engagement to the Prince of Wales, the future Edward VIII, who was serving in Italy in 1918. There was no basis for these rumors, but they were resurrected in 1919 when Yolanda joined her mother Elena of Montenegro, her sister Princess Mafalda of Savoy, and the Duchess of Aosta (Princess Hélène of Orléans) on a visit to Paris, where the prince happened to be at the same time.

On 9 July 1923 she married Giorgio Carlo Calvi, Count of Bergolo.

After her marriage Yolanda lived in the town of Pinerolo, southwest of Turin.

In 1946, Yolanda and her family went into voluntary exile with her father in Alexandria, Egypt. After King Victor Emmanuel's death, Yolanda and her family returned to Italy, where they lived at Castelporziano.

Yolanda died in a hospital in Rome and is buried in Turin.

Marriage and children
On 9 April 1923 at the Quirinal Palace in Rome, she married Giorgio Carlo Calvi, Conte di Bergolo (15 March 1887, Athens – 25 February 1977, Rome). They had five children:.

 Maria Ludovica Calvi di Bergolo (24 January 1924, Turin – 19 July 2017, Rome) married Robert Gasche (1918-2011) in 1948 (div. 1975) and had issue:
 Huberto-Omar (b. 1954)
 Elena-Maria (Yela) (b. 1955)
 Giorgio (1 May 1925 – 7 May 1925)
 Vittoria (27 June 1927, Turin – March 1986, Garda), married in 1947 Guglielmo, Conte Guarienti di Brenzone
 Emanuela (b. 1948)
 Agostino (b. 1951)
 Guariente (b. 1954)
 Guja-Anna (b. 8 March 1930, Turin), married 1951 Carlo nob. dei conti Guarienti
 Maria-Fardivia (1952 – 1971)
 Delfinella (b. 1954)
 Pier Francesco, Conte di Bergolo (22 December 1933, Turin – 18 June 2012, Rome), married in 1960 to Marisa Allasio (born 1934). Had issue:
 Carlo-Giorgio (b. 1959)
 Anda (b. 1962)

Title, styles and honours

Title
1 June 1901 – 9 April 1922: Her Royal Highness Princess Yolanda of Savoy, Princess of Italy
9 April 1922 - 25 February 1977: Her Royal Highness Princess Yolanda of Savoy, Princess of Italy, Countess of Bergolo
25 February 1977 - 16 October 1986: Her Royal Highness Princess Yolanda of Savoy, Princess of Italy, Dowager Countess of Bergolo

Honours

National honours
  House of Savoy: Knight Grand Cross of the Royal Order of Saints Maurice and Lazarus
 : Knight Grand Cross of Honour and Devotion of the Sovereign Military Order of Malta, 3rd First Class

Ancestry

Bibliography
 "Iolanda's Wedding Festivities Start", New York Times, April 8, 1923, p. 3.
 "Iolanda and Calvi Meet Italian Court", New York Times, April 9, 1923, p. 19.
 "Iolanda Wedded to Her War Hero While Crowd Cheers", New York Times, April 10, 1923, p. 1 and 3.
 "Royal Wedding in Rome", The Times, April 10, 1923, p. 12.
 "Princess Yolanda's Wedding", The Times, April 12, 1923, p. 16.
 "Princes Jolanda" [obituary], New York Times, October 18, 1986, p. 9.

References

External links

1901 births
1986 deaths
Italian royalty
Italian princesses
Princesses of Savoy
Italian countesses
Knights Grand Cross of the Order of Saints Maurice and Lazarus
Knights of Malta
Italian Roman Catholics
20th-century Roman Catholics
21st-century Roman Catholics
Nobility from Rome
Italian people of Montenegrin descent
Italian people of Serbian descent
Italian people of Austrian descent
Italian people of German descent
Italian exiles
Daughters of emperors
Daughters of kings